Bahramabad (also Romanized as Bahrāmābād) is a village in Kushk Rural District, Abezhdan District, Andika County, Khuzestan Province, Iran. At the 2006 census, its population was 62, in 11 families.

See also

References 

Populated places in Andika County